In mathematical logic, the spectrum of a sentence is the set of natural numbers occurring as the size of a finite model in which a given sentence is true.

Definition

Let ψ be a sentence in first-order logic.  The spectrum of ψ is the set of natural numbers n such that there is a finite model for ψ with n elements.

If the vocabulary for ψ consists only of relational symbols, then ψ can be regarded as a sentence in existential second-order logic (ESOL) quantified over the relations, over the empty vocabulary.  A generalised spectrum is the set of models of a general ESOL sentence.

Examples

 The spectrum of the first-order formula 

 The spectrum of the monadic second-order logic formula  is the set of even numbers. Hence the cardinality of the universe is even.
 The set of finite and co-finite sets is the set of spectra of first-order logic with the successor relation.
 The set of ultimately periodic sets is the set of spectra of monadic second-order logic with a unary function. It is also the set of spectra of monadic second-order logic with the successor function.

Properties

Fagin's theorem is a result in descriptive complexity theory that states that the set of all properties expressible in existential second-order logic is precisely the complexity class NP. It is remarkable since it is a characterization of the class NP that does not invoke a model of computation such as a Turing machine.  The theorem was proven by Ronald Fagin in 1974 (strictly, in 1973 in his doctoral thesis).

Equivalence to Turing machines

As a corollary, Jones and Selman showed that a set is a spectrum if and only if it is in the complexity class NEXP.

One direction of the proof is to show that, for every first-order formula , the problem of determining whether there is a model of the formula of cardinality n is equivalent to the problem of satisfying a formula of size polynomial in n, which is in NP(n) and thus in NEXP of the input to the problem (the number n in binary form, which is a string of size log(n)).

Now every predicate is on elements in the model, and finally every appearance of a predicate on specific elements is replaced by a new propositional variable. Equalities are replaced by their truth values according to their assignments.

For example:

For a model of cardinality 2 (i.e. n= 2) is replaced by

Which is then replaced by

Jones and Selman mention that the spectrum of first-order formulas without equality is just the set of all natural numbers not smaller than some minimal cardinality.

Other properties

The set of spectra of a theory is closed under union, intersection, addition, and multiplication. In full generality, it is not known if the set of spectra of a theory is closed by complementation; this is the so-called Asser's Problem.

See also

 Spectrum of a theory

References

 
 
 

Finite model theory